Events in the year 1015 in Norway.

Incumbents
Monarch – Earl Eric Haakonsson then Earl Sweyn Haakonsson

Events
Olaf II of Norway assumed the title of King of Norway.

Births
Harald Hardrada, king (d. 1066).

References

Norway
Years of the 11th century in Norway